Clifford Etienne (born March 9, 1970) is an American former professional boxer and convicted robber, who is currently serving a 105-year prison sentence without the possibility of parole. Known for his aggressive, high-volume style despite being a heavyweight, he fought Mike Tyson, Francois Botha, Nikolay Valuev, Calvin Brock, and Lamon Brewster.

Background
Born and raised in Louisiana, Etienne was a self-proclaimed "nerd" growing up. He attended St. Martinville High School where he was a standout linebacker, recruited by top colleges such as LSU, Nebraska, Texas A&M, and Oklahoma. This potential college football career was derailed by a 40-year prison sentence for armed robbery, which was committed at a shopping mall during his senior year. While incarcerated, Etienne, who then weighed 290 pounds, took up boxing and won the state prison boxing championship. While in prison he was a member of the "Gunslingers" prison boxing team in Louisiana and reportedly had a 30–0 prison record. He was released on good behavior after serving 10 years. While incarcerated, Etienne enrolled in classes at Southern University, and received high marks for his degree.

Professional career
Upon being paroled from prison in 1998 after serving 10 years for attempted armed robbery, he became a professional boxer; he won 29 matches (20 knockouts), lost 4, and drew 2.

Rise to the top

Etienne was named 2000's "Most Exciting Fighter to Watch" in the heavyweight division by The Ring Magazine, largely the result of his unanimous decision over then-undefeated Lawrence Clay Bey.  The fight was widely considered to be one of the best heavyweight matches of that year.  He also defeated Lamon Brewster,  the future WBO heavyweight champion, via a fairly-dominant unanimous decision after ten rounds in May 2000.

Etienne landed a contract with Showtime and his stock began to rise, but it quickly fell after an upset loss to Fres Oquendo, who stopped Etienne in the eighth round of their fight in March 2001.

After re-building some of his lost stature with wins, he was catapulted to the world's stage in a 2003 fight against Mike Tyson, where Etienne suffered a first-round knock-out only 49 seconds after being caught with a short right hand from Tyson.

Decline
After the loss to Tyson, Etienne's future seemed to be that of a journeyman opponent. Calvin Brock stopped Etienne in the third round in January 2005.

Etienne's last fight was against Nicolay Valuev. "The Beast from the East", who would go on to become the WBA champion, stopped Etienne in the third round of their fight in Bayreuth, Germany in May 2005.

Criminal activity and imprisonment

On August 11, 2005, Fightnews.com reported Etienne's ring career definitely over with the following story:

Well known heavyweight Clifford Etienne was arrested Wednesday in Baton Rouge, Louisiana on charges of armed robbery, kidnapping, and the attempted murder of a police officer. Etienne allegedly robbed a local business, car-jacked a vehicle containing a woman and her children, then pulled a gun on police officers. He is being held in East Baton Rouge Parish Prison with a $70,000 bond.

On June 22, 2006, following his trial in Baton Rouge, Etienne was found guilty and sentenced to 160 years in prison without parole for an allegedly cocaine-fueled crime spree that included robbing a check cashing business, carjacking, and attempting to shoot a police officer. In April 2013, his sentence was reduced from 160 years to 105 years due to a “technicality”, Etienne is now a painter, painting artwork from prison. He recently was given a job as a barber at the same prison.

Professional boxing record

|-
|align="center" colspan=8|29 Wins (20 knockouts, 9 decisions), 4 Losses (4 knockouts, 0 decisions), 2 Draws 
|-
| align="center" style="border-style: none none solid solid; background: #e3e3e3"|Result
| align="center" style="border-style: none none solid solid; background: #e3e3e3"|Record
| align="center" style="border-style: none none solid solid; background: #e3e3e3"|Opponent
| align="center" style="border-style: none none solid solid; background: #e3e3e3"|Type
| align="center" style="border-style: none none solid solid; background: #e3e3e3"|Round
| align="center" style="border-style: none none solid solid; background: #e3e3e3"|Date
| align="center" style="border-style: none none solid solid; background: #e3e3e3"|Location
| align="center" style="border-style: none none solid solid; background: #e3e3e3"|Notes
|-align=center
|Loss
|29–4–2
|align=left| Nikolay Valuev
|KO
|3 
|14/05/2005
|align=left| Oberfrankenhalle, Bayreuth, Germany
|align=left|
|-align=center
|Loss
|29–3–2
|align=left| Calvin Brock
|TKO
|3 
|21/01/2005
|align=left| Reliant Center, Houston, Texas, U.S.
|align=left|
|-align=center
|Win
|29–2–2
|align=left| Kenny Craven
|TKO
|2 
|27/11/2004
|align=left| Louisville Gardens, Louisville, Kentucky, U.S.
|align=left|
|-align=center
|Win
|28–2–2
|align=left| Talmadge Griffis
|UD
|10
|09/06/2004
|align=left| City Center Pavilion, Reno, Nevada, U.S.
|align=left|
|-align=center
|Win
|27–2–2
|align=left| Onebo Maxime
|UD
|8
|27/05/2004
|align=left| Alario Center, Westwego, Louisiana, U.S.
|align=left|
|-align=center
|style="background:#abcdef;"|Draw
|26–2–2
|align=left| Gilbert Martinez
|PTS
|8
|27/03/2004
|align=left| Caesars Tahoe, Stateline, Nevada, U.S.
|align=left|
|-align=center
|Win
|26–2–1
|align=left| Mike Sheppard
|KO
|2 
|21/02/2004
|align=left| Chapparells, Akron, Ohio, U.S.
|align=left|
|-align=center
|Win
|25–2–1
|align=left| Shawn Robinson
|TKO
|4 
|07/02/2004
|align=left| Riehle Brothers Pavilion, Lafayette, Indiana, U.S.
|align=left|
|-align=center
|Loss
|24–2–1
|align=left| Mike Tyson
|KO
|1 
|22/02/2003
|align=left| The Pyramid, Memphis, Tennessee, U.S.
|align=left|
|-align=center
|style="background:#abcdef;"|Draw
|24–1–1
|align=left| Francois Botha
|PTS
|10
|27/07/2002
|align=left| New Orleans Arena, New Orleans, Louisiana, U.S.
|align=left|
|-align=center
|Win
|24–1
|align=left| Terrence Lewis
|UD
|10
|27/04/2002
|align=left| Mohegan Sun Casino, Uncasville, Connecticut, U.S.
|align=left|
|-align=center
|Win
|23–1
|align=left| Gabe Brown
|TKO
|7 
|02/02/2002
|align=left| American Airlines Arena, Miami, Florida, U.S.
|align=left|
|-align=center
|Win
|22–1
|align=left| Dan Ward
|TKO
|2 
|08/12/2001
|align=left| Grand Casino, Biloxi, Mississippi, U.S.
|align=left|
|-align=center
|Win
|21–1
|align=left| Ken Murphy
|KO
|1 
|31/08/2001
|align=left| Grand Casino, Gulfport, Mississippi, U.S.
|align=left|
|-align=center
|Win
|20–1
|align=left| Arthur Weathers
|KO
|1 
|22/06/2001
|align=left| Grand Casino, Gulfport, Mississippi, U.S.
|align=left|
|-align=center
|Loss
|19–1
|align=left| Fres Oquendo
|TKO
|8 
|23/03/2001
|align=left| Texas Station Casino, Las Vegas, Nevada, U.S.
|align=left|
|-align=center
|Win
|19–0
|align=left| Lawrence Clay Bey
|UD
|10
|11/11/2000
|align=left| Mandalay Bay Resort & Casino, Las Vegas, Nevada, U.S.
|align=left|
|-align=center
|Win
|18–0
|align=left| Cliff Couser
|TKO
|3 
|09/09/2000
|align=left| Mountaineer Casino Racetrack and Resort, Chester, West Virginia, U.S.
|align=left|
|-align=center
|Win
|17–0
|align=left| Joey Guy
|KO
|3 
|30/06/2000
|align=left| Baton Rouge, Louisiana, U.S.
|align=left|
|-align=center
|Win
|16–0
|align=left| Lamon Brewster
|UD
|10
|06/05/2000
|align=left| Mellon Arena, Pittsburgh, Pennsylvania, U.S.
|align=left|
|-align=center
|Win
|15–0
|align=left| Harold Sconiers
|UD
|10
|18/03/2000
|align=left| Baton Rouge, Louisiana, U.S.
|align=left|
|-align=center
|Win
|14–0
|align=left| James Jones
|TKO
|2 
|26/02/2000
|align=left| Grand Casino, Biloxi, Mississippi, U.S.
|align=left|
|-align=center
|Win
|13–0
|align=left| Marvin Hunt
|TKO
|1 
|28/01/2000
|align=left| The Ruins, New Orleans, Louisiana, U.S.
|align=left|
|-align=center
|Win
|12–0
|align=left| Dan Conway
|TKO
|1 
|26/11/1999
|align=left| New Orleans Arena, New Orleans, Louisiana, U.S.
|align=left|
|-align=center
|Win
|11–0
|align=left| Darrell Morgan
|TKO
|1 
|17/09/1999
|align=left| All American Sports Park, Las Vegas, Nevada, U.S.
|align=left|
|-align=center
|Win
|10–0
|align=left| Clarence Goins
|KO
|1 
|08/09/1999
|align=left| Treasure Chest Casino, Kenner, Louisiana, U.S.
|align=left|
|-align=center
|Win
|9–0
|align=left| Abdul Muhaymin
|UD
|8
|20/08/1999
|align=left| Baton Rouge, Louisiana, U.S.
|align=left|
|-align=center
|Win
|8–0
|align=left| Eric Jackson
|KO
|1 
|11/06/1999
|align=left| Casino Magic, Bay St. Louis, Mississippi, U.S.
|align=left|
|-align=center
|Win
|7–0
|align=left| Ronnie Smith
|KO
|1 
|30/04/1999
|align=left| Marksville, Louisiana, U.S.
|align=left|
|-align=center
|Win
|6–0
|align=left| Larry Scott
|UD
|6
|15/04/1999
|align=left| Miccosukee Indian Gaming Resort, Miami, Florida, U.S.
|align=left|
|-align=center
|Win
|5–0
|align=left| Wesley Martin
|TKO
|6 
|27/02/1999
|align=left| Baton Rouge, Louisiana, U.S.
|align=left|
|-align=center
|Win
|4–0
|align=left| Willie Kyles
|TKO
|1 
|06/02/1999
|align=left| Casino Magic, Bay St. Louis, Mississippi, U.S.
|align=left|
|-align=center
|Win
|3–0
|align=left| Eddie Richardson
|UD
|6
|19/01/1999
|align=left| Municipal Auditorium, New Orleans, Louisiana, U.S.
|align=left|
|-align=center
|Win
|2–0
|align=left| Curt Render
|TKO
|1 
|11/12/1998
|align=left| Marksville, Louisiana, U.S.
|align=left|
|-align=center
|Win
|1–0
|align=left| John Randall
|KO
|1 
|03/12/1998
|align=left| Casino Magic, Bay St. Louis, Mississippi, U.S.
|align=left|
|-align=center

References 
 Mike Tyson KOs Clifford Etienne
 Tyson knocks out Etienne in 49 seconds
 Etienne arrested
 Heavyweight boxer Etienne arrested
 Clifford Etienne “The Black Rhino” Sentenced to 150 Years in Prison

References

External links 
 

1970 births
African-American boxers
American people convicted of robbery
American people convicted of kidnapping
American people convicted of attempted murder
American sportspeople convicted of crimes
Boxers from Louisiana
Heavyweight boxers
Living people
Sportspeople from Lafayette, Louisiana
Prisoners and detainees of Louisiana
American male boxers
21st-century African-American sportspeople
20th-century African-American sportspeople